Sudan made its Summer Paralympic Games début at the 1980 Summer Paralympics in Arnhem, sending a delegation of eleven athletes to compete in track and field, swimming and table tennis. The country did not participate again until the 2004 Summer Paralympics in Athens, where it was represented by just two competitors in track and field. Sudan was absent again at the 2008 Games.

Sudan has won one Paralympic medal, a gold won by Mohamad Ahmed Isam in 1980.

Sudan has never participated in the Winter Paralympic Games.

Medal tables

Medals by Summer Games

Medals by Summer sport

List of medalists

See also
 Sudan at the Olympics

References